Moves may refer to:
 Moves (ballet), by Jerome Robbins
 Moves (magazine), a periodical
 Moves (album), album by Singing Adams
 "Moves" (Big Sean song), 2017
 "Moves" (Olly Murs song), 2018 
 A mobile app involving exercise, acquired by Facebook, Inc. in 2014, discontinued in 2018

See also
 Move (disambiguation)
 Mover (disambiguation)